Gerard Byrne may refer to:
 Gerard Byrne (artist, born 1958), Irish figurative painter
 Gerard Byrne (artist, born 1969), Irish film, video, and photography artist
 Gerard Byrne (actor), Irish actor in TV series such as Fair City

See also
 Gerald G. Byrne (1890–1952), Newfoundland politician